The Hopeful Romantic Sampler is a three track EP released by American pop rock band This Century.

Track listing

Personnel
Members
Joel Kanitz – Vocals
 Sean Silverman – Guitar
 Alex Silverman – Bass, keyboard
 Ryan Gose – Drums

References

External links 
 iTunes | Hopeful Romantic Sampler
 Spotify | Hopeful Romantic Sampler
 
 Facebook
 Twitter
 Youtube

2010 EPs